Monodilepas monilifera carnleyensis is a subspecies of small sea snail, a keyhole limpet, a marine gastropod mollusc in the family Fissurellidae, the keyhole limpets and slit limpets. This species is found at the Auckland Islands, New Zealand.

References

 Powell A. W. B., William Collins Publishers Ltd, Auckland 1979 

Fissurellidae
Gastropods of New Zealand